Stephan Marasek (born 4 January 1970) is an Austrian former professional football player and manager who last managed SVG Reichenau.

Honours
 Austrian Bundesliga: 1995–96
 Austrian Cup: 1994–95
 UEFA Cup Winners' Cup finalist: 1995–96

References

1970 births
Living people
Austrian footballers
Association football midfielders
Austria international footballers
Austrian Football Bundesliga players
Bundesliga players
FC Admira Wacker Mödling players
SK Rapid Wien players
SC Freiburg players
FC Red Bull Salzburg players
Austrian football managers
Austrian expatriate footballers
Austrian expatriate sportspeople in Germany
Expatriate footballers in Germany
People from Mödling
Footballers from Lower Austria
FC Tirol Innsbruck players